Elizabeth Brooke, Lady Wyatt (1503–1560) was the wife of Sir Thomas Wyatt, the poet, and the mother of Thomas Wyatt the younger who led Wyatt's Rebellion against Mary I. Her parents were Thomas Brooke, 8th Baron Cobham and Dorothy Heydon, the daughter of Sir Henry Heydon.  She was the sister of George Brooke, 9th Baron Cobham and was considered a possible candidate for the sixth wife of Henry VIII of England.

Marriage and issue 
Elizabeth married twice.

First Marriage 

In 1520, Elizabeth married Sir Thomas Wyatt (1503 – 6 October 1542) and a year later, bore him a son: 
 Sir Thomas (1521–1554), who led an unsuccessful rebellion against Mary I in 1554. The aim of the rebellion was to replace the Catholic Queen Mary with her Protestant half-sister, Elizabeth. 
Early in the marriage, marital difficulties arose, with Wyatt claiming they were  'chiefly'  her fault. He repudiated her as an adulteress, although there is no record linking her with any specific man. Elizabeth separated from Thomas Wyatt in 1526 and he supported her until around 1537, when he refused to do so any longer and sent her to live with her brother, Lord Cobham. In that same year, Lord Cobham attempted to force Wyatt to continue his financial support. He refused. It wasn't until 1541, when Wyatt, accused of treason, was arrested and his properties confiscated, that the Brooke family was able to force a reconciliation as a condition for Wyatt’s pardon.

In a letter to Charles V, the imperial ambassador, Eustace Chapuys wrote that Wyatt had been released from the Tower at the request of Catherine Howard. Chapuys noted that the king had imposed two conditions; that Wyatt  'confess his guilt'  and that  'he should take back his wife from whom he had been separated upwards of 15 years, on pain of death if he be untrue to her henceforth.'  There is no evidence that this provision was ever enforced or existed. After pursuing Anne Boleyn, before her relationship with the King, Wyatt had begun a long-term affair with Elizabeth Darrell and he continued his association with his mistress.

On 14 February 1542, the night after Catherine Howard had been condemned to death for adultery, Henry VIII held a dinner for many men and women. The king was said to have paid great attention to Elizabeth and to Anne Basset and both were thought to be possible choices for his sixth wife. In early 1542, more than a year before Wyatt’s death, Elizabeth Brooke's name appeared in Spanish dispatches as one of three ladies in whom Henry VIII was said to be interested as a possible sixth wife.

The imperial ambassador, Chapuys, wrote that the lady for whom the king "showed the greatest regard was a sister of Lord Cobham, whom Wyatt, some time ago, divorced for adultery. She is a pretty young creature, with wit enough to do as badly as the others if she were to try." It would appear that the ambassador was mistaken, as at the time, Elizabeth Brooke was nearly forty years old. Perhaps Elizabeth Brooke had been confused with her beautiful young niece, Elisabeth Brooke, the eldest daughter of George Brooke, 9th Baron Cobham, who married William Parr, 1st Marquess of Northampton. Elisabeth Brooke, Lord Cobham’s daughter, may have been at court on this occasion, since she was definitely there the following year. She would have been nearly sixteen in January 1542 and in later years was accounted one of the most beautiful women of her time. More important to a king who had just rid himself of a wife (Catherine Howard) who had committed adultery, this second  Elisabeth had a spotless reputation.

Second marriage 
Following Wyatt’s death, Elizabeth Brooke married Sir Edward Warner (1511–1565), of Polstead Hall and Plumstead, Norfolk,  Lord Lieutenant of the Tower. The couple had three sons: 
 Edward, who died in infancy
 Thomas
 Henry
Warner was removed from his position on July 28, 1553, at the start of the reign of Mary I, and was arrested on suspicion of treason the following January at his house in Carter Lane when Thomas Wyatt the younger rebelled against the Crown. Warner was held for nearly a year. Elizabeth’s son was executed. Edward, the son she had with Warner, died young. Two other sons died in infancy. The family fortunes were restored under Elizabeth I and Warner reclaimed his post at the Tower of London. His wife died there in August 1560 and was buried within its precincts.

Ancestry

References

Sources

External links 
 A Who’s Who of Tudor Women
 Lady Elizabeth Brooke Wyatt Find A Grave

Further reading
 
 

Daughters of barons
Wyatt, Elizabeth
Elizabeth
1503 births
1560 deaths
Wives of knights